Ivenzo Ricky Comvalius (born on 24 June 1997), is a Surinamese professional football player who plays for Lorca Deportiva in Spain, and the Surinamese national team.

Club career
Comvalius had a trial with Dutch club Almere City in 2018. In summer 2019, he joined AS Trenčín of the Fortuna Liga on a 3-year deal. Comvalius made his debut by starting in a 1–1 draw against Ružomberok. He was replaced in the 73rd minute by Milan Corryn. Comvalius scored the equalizer against Spartak Trnava, that ended in a 2–1 win, marking his first official goal for the club.

International career
Comvalius was named to Suriname's squad for the 2021 CONCACAF Gold Cup on June 25, 2021.

International goals
Scores and results list Suriname's goal tally first.

References

1997 births
Living people
Sportspeople from Paramaribo
Surinamese footballers
Surinamese expatriate footballers
Suriname international footballers
Association football midfielders
S.V. Transvaal players
AS Trenčín players
NK Dugopolje players
SVB Eerste Divisie players
Slovak Super Liga players
First Football League (Croatia) players
Expatriate footballers in Slovakia
Surinamese expatriate sportspeople in Slovakia
Expatriate footballers in Croatia
2021 CONCACAF Gold Cup players